Makhmalbaf is an Iranian surname. Notable people with the surname include:

 Mohsen Makhmalbaf (born 1957), Iranian film director
 Samira Makhmalbaf (born 1980), Iranian film director, daughter of Mohsen Makhmalbaf
 Hana Makhmalbaf (born 1988), Iranian film director, daughter of Mohsen Makhmalbaf

Persian-language surnames